Swinderby railway station serves the villages of Swinderby, North Scarle, Eagle and Morton Hall in Lincolnshire, England.

History
It is on the Nottingham to Lincoln Line, which was engineered by George Stephenson and opened by the Midland Railway on 3 August 1846. The contractors for the line were Craven and Son of Newark and Nottingham;

There was an accident at the station on 6 June 1928. A mail train derailed due to the poor state of the track which resulted in nine passengers and eight Post Office officials being injured. One of the passengers later died from his injuries. The whole train came off the rails and the engine turned on its side.

Four elements of the station are each Grade II listed. 
The station buildings on the north platform built of white brick dating from ca. 1850. 
The station buildings on the south platform built of red brick dating from ca. 1850. 
The station master’s house on Swinderby Road built of white brick dating from ca. 1850.
The Midland Railway type 3b signal box built of wood which was opened in 1901.

Stationmasters
In 1868, Thomas Grundy, station master, was brought before Mr Justice Hannen at Lincolnshire Assizes, charged with manslaughter of John Alsobrook and Thomas Moore at Swinderby on 11 November 1867. It was alleged that the station master had not taken proper precautions with the signalling and fog warning lights on a foggy evening and this neglect of his proper duty resulted in a collision between a fish train and a government train. The driver and fireman of the fish train were killed. The prosecution were unable to prove their case and Thomas Grundy was acquitted.

Mr. Coleman ca. 1847
Thomas Grundy ca. 1854  - 1867 (afterwards station master at Collingham)
Richard Grice ca. 1871 1873
W. Watkins 1873
T. Green 1874
Thomas Clarke 1874 - 1877
William Elston 1877 - 1887 
Albert H. Baldwin 1887 - 1892
J. Meakins 1892 - 1906
E.H. Allen 1906
E. Sluter ca. 1914

Facilities
The station, adjacent to the level crossing operated from the Swinderby signal box, has two platforms which feature basic facilities. The full range of tickets for travel are purchased from the guard on the train at no extra cost. There are no retail facilities at this station.

Services
All services at Swinderby are operated by East Midlands Railway.

The station is also served by one train per day to and from London St Pancras International which are operated using a Class 222 Meridian. 

A roughly hourly service also serves the station on Sundays although services run only as far as Nottingham and do not serve stations to Leicester. There are no services to London on Sundays.

References

External links

 http://www.derby-signalling.org.uk/Newark.htm MIDLAND MICROCOSM

Railway stations in Lincolnshire
DfT Category F2 stations
Former Midland Railway stations
Railway stations in Great Britain opened in 1846
Railway stations served by East Midlands Railway
1846 establishments in England
Grade II listed buildings in Lincolnshire